Maui Dalvanius Prime (16 January 1948 – 3 October 2002) was a New Zealand entertainer and songwriter. His career spanned 30 years. He mentored many of New Zealand's Māori performers, and was a vocal and forthright supporter of Māori culture.

Early life
Born and raised in Patea, Prime was of Tainui, Ngapuhi, Ngati Ruanui, Tuwharetoa, Nga Rauru, Pakakohi and Ngāi Tahu descent. The sixth of 11 children, Prime grew up in a musical household. He attended the Church College of New Zealand located in Temple View, Hamilton during his high school years.

Career
In the late 1960s Prime moved to Wellington and worked as a cook by day and musician at night. His involvement with The Shevelles, a Māori female vocal trio from Porirua, lead to several trips to Australia.

In 1970, Prime travelled to Australia and performed at the opening of the Sydney Opera House. The dismissal of Australia's Prime Minister Gough Whitlam in 1975 inspired the song Canberra, We're Watching You, a cover of Washington, We're Watching You by the Staple Singers with lyrics adapted to the situation.

In 1983 he formed his own production company, Maui Records. And he became increasingly involved with Māori music. In 1984, Prime recorded Poi E with the Pātea Māori Club. The album was very popular in New Zealand, attaining platinum certification.

He appeared in the film Te Rua in 1990 and sang the theme song "Chudka Pā Poy", which is about apartheid.

He also worked closely with Ngoi Pēwhairangi, who helped develop Te Kohanga Reo, Māori language pre-school system. He provided the music for many of her lyrics.

Advocacy
Later, Prime became a campaigner for the return of mokomokai (preserved, tattooed human heads) from overseas museums.

Prime was an advocate for young people involved in court cases and victims of domestic violence.

At the 1999 general election, Prime stood for the Piri Wiri Tua Movement in the Te Tai Hauāuru electorate, placing seventh. During the campaign he endorsed Ken Mair who was running for the affiliated Mana Māori Movement.

Death
Prime died in 2002 in Hāwera after a long battle with cancer.  He was buried in his family urupa at Nukumaru, South Taranaki, New Zealand.

Discography

Albums

Extended plays

Singles

Production and songwriting credits

Notes

References

External links
Obituary: Dalvanius Prime - New Zealand Herald
AudioCulture profile

1948 births
2002 deaths
APRA Award winners
New Zealand songwriters
Male songwriters
New Zealand musicians
New Zealand Māori male singers
People educated at the Church College of New Zealand
Ngāti Tūwharetoa people
Ngā Rauru people
20th-century New Zealand male  singers
Unsuccessful candidates in the 1999 New Zealand general election
People from Patea
Māori-language singers